Coakley is a surname. Notable people with the surname include:

Adam Coakley (born 1987), Scottish football striker
Andy Coakley (1882–1963), US baseball pitcher born in Providence, Rhode Island
Cheryl Coakley-Rivera (active 1995–2014), US politician from Massachusetts
Daniel Coakley (born 1989), Filipino/US swimmer, member of Philippine team at 2007 Southeast Asian Games
Dexter Coakley (born 1972), US American football linebacker
Jackie Coakley (active 2014–2016), US student involved in sexual assault allegations reported in retracted article A Rape on Campus
John Coakley (active 1994–2016), professor in School of Politics & International Relations, University College, Dublin
Martha Coakley (born 1953), US Attorney General of Massachusetts
Paul Stagg Coakley (born 1955), US Roman Catholic prelate
Sarah Coakley (born 1951), English Anglican theologian
Tommy Coakley (born 1947), Scottish football player and coach
Wendy Coakley-Thompson (born 1966), US mainstream fiction author